Tynda is a town in Amur Oblast, Russia, located  northwest of Blagoveshchensk. It is an important railway junction, informally referred to as the capital of the Baikal-Amur Mainline. Its population has declined sharply in recent years:

Etymology
The name is of Evenk origin and is roughly translated as "on the river bank".

Geography
The Tynda then flows into the Gilyuy, a tributary of the Zeya, a few kilometers east of the town.

History
The settlement of Shkaruby was founded in 1917 on the present site of Tynda, as a rest stop and winter camp on the route from the Amur to the newly discovered gold fields on the Timpton River, a tributary of the Aldan. In 1928, in conjunction with construction of the highway to Yakutsk, it was renamed Tyndinsky.

In 1932, plans for what would eventually become the Baikal-Amur Mainline (BAM) named Tynda as a possible future hub station. In 1941, Tynda was granted urban-type settlement status.

The revival of the construction of the BAM  as an All-Union Komsomol Project in the early 1970s saw the reconstruction of the rail line between Bamovskaya and Tyndinsky, followed by the construction of the BAM east and west of the town. The settlement and its hub station were placed under the patronage of Komsomol brigades from Moscow, befitting its status as symbolic capital of the BAM. As its population grew due to the construction, the settlement was granted town status and received its present name on November 14, 1975.

The Amur Yakutsk Mainline (AYaM) also began construction from Tynda, with the section to Neryungri completed in 1977. Since 2019 the AYaM runs passenger services as far as Nizhny Bestyakh on the bank of the Lena River opposite Yakutsk.

The full extent of the BAM opened for full use in 1989, with the exception of the Severomuysky Tunnel. Tynda went into a decline after the BAM was completed, as the utilization of the mainline turned out to be low. Tynda's population has dropped by over 30% since the dissolution of the Soviet Union, from a high of 61,996 inhabitants recorded in the 1989 Soviet Census, to an estimated population of around 38,000 in 2008.

Climate
Tynda has a subarctic climate (Köppen climate classification Dwc) with severely cold, rather dry winters and warm, very rainy summers.

Administrative and municipal status
Within the framework of administrative divisions, Tynda serves as the administrative center of Tyndinsky District, even though it is not a part of it. As an administrative division, it is incorporated separately as Tynda Urban Okrug — an administrative unit with the status equal to that of the districts. As a municipal division, this administrative unit also has urban okrug status.

Demographics
Russians, Ukrainians, and Belarusians make up the majority of the town's population. Around 1,500 North Korean loggers worked in the region as of 2007, strictly prohibited from speaking with journalists and residing in isolated camps which are closed to all other people.

Economy and transportation

Tynda is the crossing point for the Baikal-Amur Mainline and Amur Yakutsk Mainline railways. The town's station is one of the most important on both lines and possesses a large locomotive depot.

Other than railway-related activities, the town's economy relies largely on the timber industry, with the Tyndales corporation based here. The M56 motorway to Yakutsk also passes through the town.

After being closed for a number of years, air services from Blagoveshchensk via Zeya resumed in 2007.

International relations

Twin towns and sister cities
Tynda is twinned with:
 Wenatchee, Washington, United States

References

Notes

Sources

External links
Official website of Tynda 
In pictures: Siberian showcase's decline

Cities and towns in Amur Oblast
Populated places established in 1917